Jon Petter Wastå (born 2 February 1976) is a Swedish former footballer who spent his whole playing career at Kalmar FF, as a goalkeeper.

Honours and awards
Kalmar FF
Allsvenskan: 2008
Svenska Cupen: 2007
Svenska Supercupen: 2009

References

External links

Fotbolltransfers profile

1976 births
Living people
People from Torsås Municipality
Swedish footballers
Sweden under-21 international footballers
Allsvenskan players
Kalmar FF players
Association football goalkeepers
Sportspeople from Kalmar County